Ragnhild Michelsen Steen (23 June 1911 – 30 September 2000) was a Norwegian actress.

Life
Ragnhild Michelsen was born in Narvik on 22 June 1911, the daughter of Carl F. Michelsen and Clara Kokmann. Her first stage experience came while attending school in Oslo; Nissen and Hegdehaugen. She made her stage debut at Søilen Teater, subsequently working at the Carl Johan Theater from 1935 to 1940 and Den Nationale Scene from 1940 to 1947. Some of her major roles were in Twelfth Night, Mary Stuart and  Brand. She later worked at Folketeateret from 1952 and lastly Fjernsynsteatret from 1961 to 1981.

In 1958, she made her film debut with Arild Brinchmann's film, Ut av mørket. She was described as an "almost compulsory" participant in Norwegian films for "a number of years". 

In November 1963, a political satire written by Arild Feldborg as "a pendant" to Vaughn Meader's The First Family, was published as a spoken word album. Performed by Ragnhild Michelsen and Rolf Just Nilsen, the album "Dagligliv i Folkehjemmet" sold as well as to immediately reach top 10 at the Norwegian chart VG-lista. In December the same year, the follow-up album "Jul i Folkehjemmet" was released, joining "Dagligliv i Folkehjemmet" on top 10. Michelsen retired in 1981, but still featured in select films until 1990.

Filmography 
1958: Ut av mørket
1958: Folkehjemmet 
1960: Det store varpet 
1963: Freske fraspark 
1963: Elskere
1966: Afrikaneren 
1967: Det største spillet 
1968: Skipper Worse
1974: Crash 
1974: Rallarblod 
1974: Kimen 
1975: En gutt som Jan 
1987: Over grensen 
1990: Til en ukjent

References

External links
 

1911 births
2000 deaths
Norwegian film actresses
Norwegian stage actresses
Norwegian television actresses